Ash-Shuyukh or al-Shuyukh is a Palestinian town in the Hebron Governorate of the State of Palestine, located 6 km northeast of the city of Hebron. According to the Palestinian Central Bureau of Statistics, Ash-Shuyukh had a population of over 8,811 in 2007.

Like the rest of the Hebron area, ash-Shuyukh is an agricultural area. Primary crops include olives, figs, almonds, lentils, peaches and apricots. Olive groves cover 980 dunams while grains and pulses cover 680 dunams. There are about 2,000 sheep and goats in the town raised as livestock.

History

Ottoman era
During the Ottoman era, in 1838, Edward Robinson noted esh-Shiyukh as “a well built village”.

French explorer Victor Guérin visited in 1863, and noted that the village was situated on a high rocky hill. It had 200 inhabitants and a small mosque  dedicated to a "Cheikh Ibrahim el-Hedmi."

An Ottoman village list of about 1870 counted 33 houses and a population of  99 in Schijuch, though the population count included men only.

In 1883, the PEF's Survey of Western Palestine described it as a "well-built village standing high, and visible from Tekua. There are a few trees round it, and caves. The water supply is from cisterns, and there is a spring to the north."

British Mandate era
In the 1922 census of Palestine conducted by the British Mandate authorities, 'Al Shiukh had a population 792 inhabitants, all Muslims. This had increased at the time of the 1931 census to 925 Muslims, in 180 inhabited houses.

The first school was established in 1940 by Mohammed Mahmoud Eid.

In the 1945 statistics the population of Ash-Shuyukh was 1,240, all Muslims, who owned 22,091 dunams of land according to an official land and population survey. 1,713 dunams were plantations and irrigable land, 3,365 for cereals, while 24 dunams were built-up (urban) land.

Jordanian Era
In the wake of the 1948 Arab–Israeli War, and after the 1949 Armistice Agreements, Ash-Shuyukh came  under Jordanian rule  It was annexed by Jordan in 1950.

The Jordanian census of 1961 found 1,660 inhabitants in Shuyukh.

Post 1967
Since the Six-Day War in 1967, Ash-Shuyukh has been under Israeli occupation.

Another school was built in 2002 and named in honor of a resident killed during the al-Aqsa Intifada.

References

Bibliography

  

 
  

 

 (p.   185)

External links
Welcome To al-Shuyukh
Shyoukh, Welcome to Palestine
Survey of Western Palestine, Map 21:  IAA, Wikimedia commons 
 Ash Shuyukh Town (Fact Sheet),   Applied Research Institute–Jerusalem (ARIJ)
Ash Shuyukh Town Profil, ARIJ
Ash Shuyukh Town Areal Photol, ARIJ
The priorities and needs for development in Ash Shuyukh town based on the community and local authorities’ assessment, ARIJ

Hebron Governorate
Municipalities of West Bank
Municipalities of the State of Palestine